Domysłów  is a village in the administrative district of Gmina Wolin, within Kamień County, West Pomeranian Voivodeship, in north-western Poland.

The village has a population of 200.

References

Villages in Kamień County
Burial sites of the House of Pomerania